The 2016 Southern Utah Thunderbirds football team represented Southern Utah University in the 2016 NCAA Division I FCS football season. They were led by first-year head coach Demario Warren and played their home games at Eccles Coliseum. This was their fifth year as a member of the Big Sky Conference. They finished the season 6–5, 5–3 in Big Sky play to finish in a tie for fourth place.

Schedule

 Source: Schedule

Game summaries

at Utah

Sources:

Game Stats: 
Passing: SUU: McCoy Hill 6-12-0--42, Tannon Pedersen 0-6-1--0; Utah: Troy Williams 20-35-0--272, Tyler Huntley 3-4-0--26.
Rushing: SUU: Malik Brown 10-49, Ty Rutledge 1-33, Hill 8-26, Raysean Pringle 5-13, James Felila 3-9, Isaiah Diego-Wi 1-0, Pedersen 4-(-14); Utah: Troy McCormick 12-55, Joe Williams 12-49, Armand Shyne 8-19, T. Williams 5-15.
Receiving: SUU: Mike Sharp 1-14, Steven Wroblews 1-12, Rutledge 1-9, Logan Parker 1-6, Felila 1-4, Pringle 1-(-3); Utah: Tim Patrick 5-105, Rae Singleton 2-56, Troy McCormick 3-55, Tyrone Smith 3-31, Evan Moeai 1-18, Walla Gonzales 1-11, Demari Simpkins 1-8, Siaosi Wilkins 1-8, Terrell Burgess 1-7, Kyle Fulks 2-1, Joe Williams 3-(-2)
Interceptions: Utah: Marcus Williams 1-0.

Southeastern Louisiana

Sources:

Game Stats: 
Passing: SLU: Justin Alo 18-31-2--275; SUU: Patrick Tyler 18-28-0--188, Mike Sharp 1-1-0--34, Ty Rutledge 0-1-0--0.
Rushing: SLU: Kaelyn Henderson 5-46, Julius Maracalin 6-40, Rasheed Harrell 7-36,  Alo 7-13, Darius Durall 7-13,  Jake Ingarfia 1-(-2), Micah Thomas 1-(-3) ; SUU: Malik Brown 32-146, Raysean Pringle 6-30, James Felia 4-17, Tate Lewis 1-10, Tyler 6-8, Rutledge 3-6, Team 2-(-2).
Receiving: SLU: Brandon Acker 8-146, Juwan Dickey 5-88, Juwaan Rogers 3-39, Joe Pack 1-4, Javon Conner 1-(-2); SUU: Brady Measom 6-58, Mike Sharp 4-64, Steven Wroblews 4-59, Logan Parker 2-23, Desean Holmes 2014, Rutledge 1-4.
Interceptions: SUU: Mike Needham 1-4, Tyler Collett 1-0.

Portland State

at Montana

UC Davis

at North Dakota

Weber State

at Idaho State

Montana State

at BYU

at Northern Arizona

Ranking movements

References

Southern Utah
Southern Utah Thunderbirds football seasons
Southern Utah Thunderbirds football